Federico Colbertaldo (born 17 October 1988) is an Italian freestyle swimmer.

In 2006, Colbertaldo was Junior European Champion in 400 m freestyle and won the silver medal in 200 m and 1500 m of the same stroke.

He represented Italy at the 2007 World Aquatics Championships swimming 800 m freestyle and winning the bronze medal.

See also 
 Italian record progression 400 metres freestyle
 Italian record progression 800 metres freestyle

External links 
 Federico Colbertaldo on FIN's website 
 

1988 births
Living people
People from Valdobbiadene
Italian male swimmers
Swimmers at the 2008 Summer Olympics
Italian male freestyle swimmers
World Aquatics Championships medalists in swimming
Olympic swimmers of Italy
Universiade medalists in swimming
Mediterranean Games silver medalists for Italy
Mediterranean Games medalists in swimming
Swimmers at the 2009 Mediterranean Games
Universiade silver medalists for Italy
Universiade bronze medalists for Italy
Medalists at the 2009 Summer Universiade
Sportspeople from the Province of Treviso